The Quinault Cultural Center and Museum is a museum of culture in Taholah, Washington, owned and funded by the Quinault Indian Nation. It contains artifacts, arts, and crafts of the Quinault, housed in a converted retail building. Some of the art forms have been influenced by Polynesian cultural motifs, brought home by World War II veterans.

The museum received a grant from the Institute of Museum and Library Services in 2012 to conduct research, publish a guidebook, and create a mobile museum exhibit on the tribe's ethnobotanical heritage.

In 2013, the Cultural Center hosted workshops on paddle- and drum-making for thousands of visitors to the Tribal Canoe Journeys.

References

External links

Ethnic museums in Washington (state)
Coast Salish museums in Washington (state)
Museums in Grays Harbor County, Washington
Cultural center and museum